Bohnice is a district in the north of Prague, located in Prague 8, some 5 km north of city centre. The district is home to a large psychiatric hospital and a large panel housing estate in which all of the streets are named after cities or regions of Poland.

Neighbouring districts

Districts of Prague